A hazard is a potential source of harm. Substances, events, or circumstances can constitute hazards when their nature would allow them, even just theoretically, to cause damage to health, life, property, or any other interest of value. The probability of that harm being realized in a specific incident, combined with the magnitude of potential harm, make up its risk, a term often used synonymously in colloquial speech.

Hazards can be classified in several ways; they can be classified as natural, anthropogenic, technological, or any combination, such as in the case of the natural phenomenon of wildfire becoming more common due to human-made climate change or more harmful due to changes in building practices. A common theme across many forms of hazards in the presence of stored energy that, when released, can cause damage. The stored energy can occur in many forms: chemical, mechanical, thermal hazards and by the populations that may be affected and the severity of the associated risk. In most cases, a hazard may affect a range of targets and have little or no effect on others.

Identification of hazards assumes that the potential targets are defined, and is the first step in performing a risk assessment.

Characteristics

Environmental hazards include long term environmental deterioration such as acidification of soils and build-up of atmospheric carbon dioxide to communal and involuntary social hazards such as crime and terrorism to voluntary and personal hazards such as drug abuse and mountain climbing. Environmental hazards usually have defined or common characteristics including their tendency to be rapid onset events meaning they occur with a short warning time, they have a clear source of origin which is easily identified, the impact will be swift and losses suffered quickly during or shortly after the onset of the event, risk of exposure is usually involuntary due to location or proximity of people to the hazard and the "disaster occurs with an intensity and scale that justifies an emergency response".

Hazards may be grouped according to their characteristics.  These factors are related to geophysical events, which are not process specific:
 Areal extent of damage zone
 Intensity of impact at a point
 Duration of impact at a point
 Rate of onset of the event
 Predictability of the event

Natural hazards may be defined as "extreme events that originate in the biosphere, hydrosphere, lithosphere or atmosphere" or "a potential threat to humans and their welfare" which include earthquake, landslide, hurricane and tsunamis. Technological and man-made hazards include explosions, the release of toxic materials, episodes of severe contamination, structural collapses, and transportation, construction and manufacturing accidents etc. A distinction can also be made between rapid-onset natural hazards, technological hazards, and social hazards, which are described as being of sudden occurrence and relatively short duration, and the consequences of longer-term environmental degradation such as desertification and drought.

In defining hazard Keith Smith argues that what may be defined as the hazard is only a hazard if there is the presence of humans to make it a hazard and that it is otherwise merely an event of interest. In this sense, the environmental conditions we may consider hostile or hazardous can be seen as neutral in that it is our perception, human location and actions which identify resources and hazards within the range of natural events. In this regard, human sensitivity to environmental hazards is a combination of both physical exposure (natural and/or technological events at a location related to their statistical variability) and human vulnerability (about social and economic tolerance of the same location).

Smith states that natural hazards are best seen in an ecological framework to distinguish between natural events as natural hazards. He says, "natural hazards, therefore, result from the conflict of geophysical processes with people and they lie at the interface what has been called the natural events system and the human interface system." He says that "this interpretation of natural hazards gives humans a central role. Firstly through location, because it is only when people and their possessions get in the way of natural processes that hazard exists."

A natural hazard can be considered as a geophysical event when it occurs in extremes and a human factor is involved that may present a risk. In this context, we can see that there may be an acceptable variation of magnitude which can vary from the estimated normal or average range with upper and lower limits or thresholds. In these extremes, the natural occurrence may become an event that presents a risk to the environment or people. Smith says "most social and economic activities are geared to some expectation of the 'average' conditions. As long as the variation of the environmental element remains fairly close to this expected performance, insignificant damage occurs and the element will be perceived as beneficial. However, when the variability exceeds some threshold beyond the normal band of tolerance, the same variable starts to impose a stress on society and become a hazard." Thus, above-average wind speeds resulting in a tropical depression or hurricane according to intensity measures on the Saffir–Simpson scale will provide an extreme natural event that may be considered a hazard.

Classification
Hazards can be classified as different types in several ways. One of these ways is by specifying the origin of the hazard. One key concept in identifying a hazard is the presence of stored energy that, when released, can cause damage.  The stored energy can occur in many forms:  chemical, mechanical, thermal, radioactive, electrical, etc.  Another class of hazard does not involve the release of stored energy, but the presence of hazardous situations. Examples include confined or limited egress spaces, oxygen-depleted atmospheres, awkward positions, repetitive motions, low-hanging or protruding objects, etc.

Hazards may also be classified as natural, anthropogenic, or technological. They may also be classified as health or safety hazards and by the populations that may be affected and the severity of the associated risk.

In most cases, a hazard may affect a range of targets and have little or no effect on others. Identification of hazards assumes that the potential targets are defined.

Hazards to navigation are another formal classification of hazard. They are usually only hazardous in the context of obstructions to the passage of shipping in their vicinity.

Based on origin

Natural hazards 

Natural hazards such as earthquakes, floods, volcanoes and tsunami have threatened people, society, the natural environment, and the built environment, particularly more vulnerable people, throughout history, and in some cases, on a day-to-day basis. According to the Red Cross, each year 130,000 people are killed, 90,000 are injured and 140 million are affected by unique events known as natural disasters.

Recent policy-oriented work into hazard management began with the work of Gilbert White, the first person to study engineering schemes as a means of mitigating flooding in the US. From 1935 to 1967  White and his colleagues led the research into flood defences, and further collaboration on the investigation was undertaken at the University of Chicago.

In December 1989, after several years of preparation, the United Nations General Assembly adopted resolution 44/236 proclaiming the 1990s as the International Decade for Natural Disaster Reduction. The objective of that decade was stated in the annexe of Resolution 44/236 as follows:
"…to reduce through concerted international action, especially in developing countries, the loss of life, property damage, and social and economic disruption caused by natural disasters, such as earthquakes, wind-storms, tsunamis, floods, landslides, volcanic eruptions, wildfire, grasshopper and locust infestations, drought and desertification and other calamities of natural origin."

Methods to reduce risk from natural hazards include construction of high-risk facilities away from areas with high risk, engineering redundancy, emergency reserve funds, purchasing relevant insurance, and the development of operational recovery plans.

Anthropogenic hazards 

Hazards due to human behaviour and activity. The social, natural and built environment are not only at risk from geophysical hazards but also from technological hazards including industrial explosions, the release of chemical hazards and major accident hazards (MAHs).

Technological hazards

Hazards due to technology, and therefore a sub-class of anthropogenic hazards.

Sociological hazards

Hazards due to sociological causes, also a sub-class of anthropogenic hazards. Sociological hazards include crime, terrorist threats and war.

Based on energy source

Biological hazard 

Biological hazards, also known as biohazards, originate in biological processes of living organisms and refer to agents that pose a threat to the health of living organisms, the security of property, or the health of the environment. The term and its associated symbol may be used as a warning so that those potentially exposed to the substances will know to take precautions.  The biohazard symbol was developed in 1966 by Charles Baldwin, an environmental-health engineer working for the Dow Chemical Company on the containment products. and is used in the labelling of biological materials that carry a significant health risk, such as viral samples and used hypodermic needles.

Biological hazards include viruses, parasites, bacteria, food, fungi, and foreign toxins. Many specific biological hazards have been identified. For example, the hazards of naturally occurring bacteria such as Escherichia coli and Salmonella are well known as disease-causing pathogens, and a variety of measures have been taken to limit human exposure to these microorganisms through food safety, good personal hygiene, and education. However, the potential for new biological hazards exists through the discovery of new microorganisms and the development of new genetically modified (GM) organisms. The use of new GM organisms is regulated by various governmental agencies. The US Environmental Protection Agency (EPA) controls GM plants that produce or resist pesticides (i.e. Bt corn and Roundup ready crops). The US Food and Drug Administration (FDA) regulates GM plants that will be used as food or for medicinal purposes.

Biological hazards can include medical waste or samples of a microorganism, virus or toxin (from a biological source) that can affect health. Many biological hazards are associated with food, including certain viruses, parasites, fungi, bacteria, and plant and seafood toxins. Pathogenic Campylobacter and Salmonella are common foodborne biological hazards. The hazards from these bacteria can be avoided through risk mitigation steps such as proper handling, storing, and cooking of food. Disease in humans can come from biological hazards in the form of infection by bacteria, antigens, viruses, or parasites.

Chemical hazard 

A chemical can be considered a hazard if by its intrinsic properties it can cause harm or danger to humans, property, or the environment. Health hazards associated with chemicals are dependent on the dose or amount of the chemical. For example, iodine in the form of potassium iodate is used to produce iodised salt. When applied at a rate of 20  mg of potassium iodate per 1000  mg of table salt, the chemical is beneficial in preventing goitre, while iodine intakes of 1200–9500  mg in one dose has been known to cause death. Some chemicals have a cumulative biological effect, while others are metabolically eliminated over time. Other chemical hazards may depend on concentration or total quantity for their effects.

A variety of chemical hazards (e.g. DDT, atrazine, etc.) have been identified. However, every year companies produce more new chemicals to fill new needs or to take the place of older, less effective chemicals. Laws, such as the Federal Food, Drug, and Cosmetic Act and the Toxic Substances Control Act in the US, require protection of human health and the environment for any new chemical introduced. In the US, the EPA regulates new chemicals that may have environmental impacts (i.e., pesticides or chemicals released during a manufacturing process), while the FDA regulates new chemicals used in foods or as drugs. The potential hazards of these chemicals can be identified by performing a variety of tests before the authorization of usage. The number of tests required and the extent to which the chemicals are tested varies, depending on the desired usage of the chemical. Chemicals designed as new drugs must undergo more rigorous tests than those used as pesticides.

Some harmful chemicals occur naturally in certain geological formations, such as radon gas or arsenic. Other chemicals include products with commercial uses, such as agricultural and industrial chemicals, as well as products developed for home use.  Pesticides, which are normally used to control unwanted insects and plants, may cause a variety of negative effects on non-target organisms. DDT can build up, or bioaccumulate, in birds, resulting in thinner-than-normal eggshells, which can break in the nest. The organochlorine pesticide dieldrin has been linked to Parkinson's disease. Corrosive chemicals like sulfuric acid, which is found in car batteries and research laboratories, can cause severe skin burns. Many other chemicals used in industrial and laboratory settings can cause respiratory, digestive, or nervous system problems if they are inhaled, ingested, or absorbed through the skin. The negative effects of other chemicals, such as alcohol and nicotine, have been well documented.

Ergonomic hazard 

Ergonomic hazards are physical conditions that may pose a risk of injury to the musculoskeletal system, such as the muscles or ligaments of the lower back, tendons or nerves of the hands/wrists, or bones surrounding the knees.  Ergonomic hazards include things such as awkward or extreme postures, whole-body or hand/arm vibration, poorly designed tools, equipment, or workstations, repetitive motion, and poor lighting.  Ergonomic hazards occur in both occupational and non-occupational settings such as in workshops, building sites, offices, home, school, or public spaces and facilities.

Mechanical hazard 

A mechanical hazard is any hazard involving a machine or industrial process. Motor vehicles, aircraft, and air bags pose mechanical hazards. Compressed gases or liquids can also be considered a mechanical hazard.
Hazard identification of new machines and/or industrial processes occurs at various stages in the design of the new machine or process. These hazard identification studies focus mainly on deviations from the intended use or design and the harm that may occur as a result of these deviations. These studies are regulated by various agencies such as the Occupational Safety and Health Administration and the National Highway Traffic Safety Administration.

Physical hazard 

A physical hazard is a naturally occurring process that has the potential to create loss or damage. Physical hazards include earthquakes, floods, fires, and tornadoes. Physical hazards often have both human and natural elements. Flood problems can be affected by the natural elements of climate fluctuations and storm frequency, and by land drainage and building in a flood plain, human elements.  Another physical hazard, X-rays,  naturally occur from solar radiation, but have also been utilized by humans for medical purposes; however, overexposure can lead to cancer, skin burns, and tissue damage.

Psychosocial hazard 

Psychological or psychosocial hazards are hazards that affect the psychological well-being of people, including their ability to participate in a work environment among other people. Psychosocial hazards are related to the way work is designed, organized, and managed, as well as the economic and social contexts of work, and are associated with psychiatric, psychological, and/or physical injury or illness. Linked to psychosocial risks are issues such as occupational stress and workplace violence, which are recognized internationally as major challenges to occupational health and safety.

Based on effects

Health hazards 
Hazards that would affect the health of exposed persons, usually having an acute or chronic illness as the consequence. Fatality would not normally be an immediate consequence. Health hazards may cause measurable changes in the body which are generally indicated by the development of signs and symptoms in the exposed persons, or non-measurable, subjective symptoms.

Safety hazards 
Hazards that would affect the safety of individuals, usually having an injury or immediate fatality as the consequence of an incident.

Economic hazards 
Hazards that would affect property, wealth and the economy.

Environmental hazards 

Any single or combination of toxic chemical, biological, or physical agents in the environment, resulting from human activities or natural processes, that may affect the health of exposed subjects, including pollutants such as heavy metals, pesticides, biological contaminants, toxic waste, and industrial and home chemicals Hazards that would affect the environment, particularly the natural environment and ecosystems.

Disasters 

Disaster can be defined as a serious disruption, occurring over a relatively short time, of the functioning of a community or a society involving widespread human, material, economic, societal or environmental loss and impacts, which exceeds the ability of the affected community or society to cope using its own resources. Disaster can manifest in various forms, threatening those people or environments specifically vulnerable. Such impacts include loss of property, death, injury, trauma or post-traumatic stress disorder.

Disaster can take various forms, including hurricane, volcano, tsunami, earthquake, drought, famine, plague, disease, rail crash, car crash, tornado, deforestation, flooding, toxic release, and spills (oil, chemicals). These can affect people and the environment on the local regional level, national level or international level (Wisner et al., unknown) where the international community becomes involved with aid donation, governments give money to support affected countries' economies with disaster response and post-disaster reconstruction.

A disaster hazard is an extreme geophysical event that is capable of causing a disaster. 'Extreme' in this case means a substantial variation in either the positive or the negative direction from the normal trend; flood disasters can result from exceptionally high precipitation and river discharge, and drought is caused by exceptionally low values. The fundamental determinants of hazard and the risk of such hazards occurring is timing, location, magnitude and frequency. For example, magnitudes of earthquakes are measured on the Richter scale from 1 to 10, whereby each increment of 1 indicates a tenfold increase in severity. The magnitude-frequency rule states that over a significant period of time many small events and a few large ones will occur. Hurricanes and typhoons on the other hand occur between 5 degrees and 25 degrees north and south of the equator, tending to be seasonal phenomena that are thus largely recurrent in time and predictable in location due to the specific climate variables necessary for their formation.

Major disaster, as it is usually assessed on quantitative criteria of death and damage, was defined by Sheehan and Hewitt (1969), having to conform to the following criteria:
 At least 100 people dead, 
 at least 100 people injured, or 
 at least $1 million damage

This definition includes indirect losses of life caused after the initial onset of the disaster such as secondary effects of, e.g., cholera or dysentery. This definition is still commonly used but has the limitations of number of deaths, injuries, and damage (in $). UNDRO (1984) defined a disaster in a more qualitative fashion as:

an event, concentrated in time and space, in which a community undergoes severe danger and incurs such losses to its members and physical appurtenances that the social structure is disrupted and the fulfilment of all or some of the essential functions of the society is prevented.

As with other definitions of disaster, this definition not only encompasses the social aspect of disaster impact and stresses potentially caused but also focuses on losses, implying the need for emergency response as an aspect of the disaster. It does not, however, set out quantitative thresholds or scales for damage, death, or injury, respectively.

Status of a hazard

Hazards are sometimes classified into three modes or statuses:
 Dormant—The situation environment is currently affected.  For instance, a hillside may be unstable, with the potential for a landslide, but there is nothing below or on the hillside that could be affected.
 Armed—People, property, or environment are in potential harm's way.
 Active—A harmful incident involving the hazard has actually occurred.  Often this is referred to not as an "active hazard" but as an accident, emergency, incident, or disaster.

Risk 

The terms "hazard" and "risk" are often used interchangeably. However, in terms of risk assessment, these are two very distinct terms. A hazard is an agent that can cause harm or damage to humans, property, or the environment. Risk is the probability that exposure to a hazard will lead to a negative consequence, or more simply, a hazard poses no risk if there is no exposure to that hazard.

Risk can be defined as the likelihood or probability of a given hazard of a given level causing a particular level of loss of damage. The elements of risk are populations, communities, the built environment, the natural environment, economic activities and services which are under threat of disaster in a given area. The total risk according to UNDRO 1982 is the "sum of predictable deaths, injuries, destruction, damage, disruption, and costs of repair and mitigation caused by a disaster of a particular level in a given area or areas".

David Alexander  distinguishes between risk and vulnerability, saying that "vulnerability refers to the potential for casualty, destruction, damage, disruption or other forms of loss in a particular element: risk combines this with the probable level of loss to be expected from a predictable magnitude of hazard (which can be considered as the manifestation of the agent that produces the loss)." Since hazards have varying degrees of severity, the more intense or severe the hazard, the greater vulnerability there will be since the potential for damage and destruction is increased for the severity of the hazard. Ben Wisner argues that risk or disaster is "a compound function of the natural hazard and the number of people, characterised by their varying degrees of vulnerability to that specific hazard, who occupy the space and time of exposure to the hazard event." (Wisner, et al., 1994).

Another definition of risk is "the probable frequency and probable magnitude of future losses". This definition also focuses on the probability of future loss whereby the degree of vulnerability to hazard represents the level of risk on a particular population or environment. The threats posed by a hazard are:
 Hazards to people – death, injury, disease and stress
 Hazards to goods – property damage and economic loss
 Hazards to environment –loss of flora and fauna, pollution and loss of amenity

Marking of hazards

Hazard symbols or warning symbols are easily recognizable symbols designed to warn about hazardous materials, locations, or objects. The use of hazard symbols is often regulated by law and directed by standards organizations. Hazard symbols may appear with different colours, backgrounds, borders and supplemental information to specify the type of hazard and the level of threat (for example, toxicity classes).  Warning symbols are used in many places in place of or in addition to written warnings as they are quickly recognized (faster than reading a written warning) and more universally understood, as the same symbol can be recognized as having the same meaning to speakers of different languages.
Navigational hazards are generally marked on nautical charts, and are also often marked by moored buoys, and changes are published in notices to mariners.

See also

References

External links